Ward is an unincorporated community in Sumter County, Alabama, United States. Its ZIP code is 36922.

Notes

Unincorporated communities in Sumter County, Alabama
Unincorporated communities in Alabama